Speocirolana is a genus of crustacean in family Cirolanidae. They occur in Mexico from San Luis Potosi northwards and in southern Texas (United States). They are stygobionts. They measure  in total length.

Species
Speocirolana contains the following species:

References

Cymothoida
Isopod genera
Freshwater crustaceans of North America
Taxonomy articles created by Polbot